The Kampala–Mpigi Expressway, also Busega–Mpigi Expressway, is a four-lane, dual carriage highway under construction in the Central Region of Uganda, connecting, Kampala, the capital city, and Mpigi, the headquarters of Mpigi District.

Location
The road starts at Busega, a neighborhood in Rubaga Division in the city of Kampala. The approximate coordinates of the road, near the town of Maya, are 0°15'54.0"N, 32°25'49.0"E (Latitude:0.265012; Longitude:32.430288). The expressway is a component of the Kampala–Masaka Road.

Background
The current road is a two-lane single carriageway in good condition. The government of Uganda plans to widen the road to a four-lane dual carriage highway, as part of its efforts to decongest Kampala. The construction is planned to be funded under a public-private partnership arrangement.

The design includes four major interchanges at Nabbingo, Nsangi, Maya and Lugala. These interchanges will allow connection with the Kampala Northern Bypass Highway and the Entebbe–Kampala Expressway. The government of Uganda has secured funding of US$91 million (UShs322 billion) to fund the  section between Busega and Mpigi. The  section between Kibuye and Busega is to be expanded by China Communications Construction Company (CCCC), with funding from the Exim Bank of China, once CCCC has completed the Entebbe-Kampala Expressway.

Timetable
In 2014, the China Communications Construction Company, which was also commissioned to build the Entebbe–Kampala Expressway, was contracted to construct an interchange at Busega which connects the two expressways. In December 2016, the Daily Monitor reported that construction was expected to begin in 2018 and last three years.

In July 2019, after delays, the construction contract was awarded to a consortium of Chinese companies, that includes China Civil Engineering Construction Corporation (CCECC) and China Railway 19th Bureau Group Company Limited. Construction was expected to last 36 months, with commissioning planned for the second half of 2022. Construction began in May 2020 and completion was expected sometime in 2023.

Due to delays occasioned by the COVID-19 pandemic, compensation disputes and other challenges, only 15 percent of the work had been completed as of March 2022. A new completion date is now given as being 2025.

Construction costs
Application for funding has been made to the African Development Bank (AfDB). The estimated cost of the road was budgeted at approximately US$100 million, as reported by the Daily Monitor. The cost is now budgeted at US$91 million (loan from AfDB) plus $41 million contributed by the government of Uganda for a total of US$132 million.

In July 2019, the Daily Monitor newspaper quoted the contract price at Shs547 billion (approx. US$150 million), partly borrowed from the African Development Bank (AfDB). The New Vision, another Ugandan newspaper reported that the entire construction cost was funded by an AfDB loan.

See also
 List of roads in Uganda

References

External links
 Uganda National Road Authority Homepage
 Ugandan Government Increases Road Network Funding
 Uganda: Work On Shs5 Trillion Jinja Expressway to Start in March 2016

Roads in Uganda
Kampala District
Mpigi District
Wakiso District
Road infrastructure in Africa